Třebovice is a municipality and village in Ústí nad Orlicí District in the Pardubice Region of the Czech Republic. It has about 800 inhabitants.

Notable people
Josef Schwarz (born 1941), German long jumper

References

External links

Villages in Ústí nad Orlicí District